Nothing Touches Me is the fifth studio album by Australian rock band British India, released through Liberation Music on 13 March 2015. It debuted at number 5 on the ARIA charts, the group's fourth album in a row to reach the top 10.

Background 

Australian garage rock band, British India, released their fifth studio album, Nothing Touches Me in March 2015 via Liberation Music. The line-up was Will Drummond on bass guitar, Declan Melia on lead vocals and guitar, Matt O'Gorman on drums, and Nic Wilson on lead guitar. Although the band attempted to record it in Berlin in late 2014, the results were lacklustre. They returned to Sing Sing studios in Melbourne where it was produced by Glenn Goldsmith, again. Nothing Touches Me debuted at number five on the Australian albums chart, their fourth album in a row to reach the top ten. It provided two singles, "Wrong Direction" (October 2014) and "Suddenly" (2015). The band toured in support of the album and headlined the main stage at the 2015 Byron Bay Bluesfest as a replacement for The Black Keys.

Track listing

Personnel

British India
Will Drummond – bass guitar, backing vocals
Declan Melia – lead vocals, guitar
Matt O'Gorman – drums
Nic Wilson – lead guitar

Artisans
 Glenn Goldsmith – producer
 Callum Barter – mixing engineer, recording engineer
 Aaron Dobos – recording engineer

Charts

References

External links

Official Site archived from www.britishindiaofficial.com/ on 12 April 2020

2013 albums
British India (band) albums